Mr.Mr., Mr. Mister or Mister Mister may refer to:

 Mr. Mister, a sinister character in 1937 musical The Cradle Will Rock
 Mr.Mr. (EP), by Girls' Generation
 "Mr.Mr." (song), by Girls' Generation
 Mr.Mr (band), a South Korean band
 Mr. Mister, an American band
 "Mista Mista", a song from the CD version of The Score (Fugees album)